This is a list of 141 species in Neomochtherus, a genus of robber flies in the family Asilidae.

Neomochtherus species

 Neomochtherus acratus Tsacas, 1968 c g
 Neomochtherus aegaeus Tsacas, 1965 c g
 Neomochtherus aegyptius (Macquart, 1838) c g
 Neomochtherus aerifacies Tsacas, 1968 c g
 Neomochtherus africanus (Ricardo, 1919) c
 Neomochtherus alaicus Lehr, 1996 c g
 Neomochtherus albicans (Loew, 1849) c g
 Neomochtherus albicomus (Hine, 1909) i c g
 Neomochtherus analis (Macquart, 1838) c g
 Neomochtherus angustipennis (Hine, 1909) i c g
 Neomochtherus annulitarsis (Loew, 1858) c g
 Neomochtherus aquitanus Tsacas, 1964 c g
 Neomochtherus arabicus (Macquart, 1838) c g
 Neomochtherus atripes Oldroyd, 1958 c g
 Neomochtherus atrox Tsacas, 1969 c g
 Neomochtherus auratus Janssens, 1968 c g
 Neomochtherus auricomus (Hine, 1909) i c g b
 Neomochtherus blandus Tsacas, 1969 c g
 Neomochtherus brevipennis Seguy, 1932 c g
 Neomochtherus californicus (Hine, 1909) i c g b
 Neomochtherus callipygus Tsacas, 1969 c g
 Neomochtherus candidus (Becker, 1923) c g
 Neomochtherus carthaginis (Becker, 1915) c g
 Neomochtherus catharius Tsacas, 1968 c g
 Neomochtherus caucasicus Tsacas, 1968 c g
 Neomochtherus clypeatus (Becker, 1915) c g
 Neomochtherus comosus (Hine, 1918) i c g b
 Neomochtherus confusus Tsacas, 1965 c g
 Neomochtherus congedus (Walker, 1851) c g
 Neomochtherus corcyraeus Tsacas, 1965 c g
 Neomochtherus cypreus Tsacas, 1968 c g
 Neomochtherus cythereius Tsacas, 1965 c g
 Neomochtherus debilis Tsacas, 1969 c g
 Neomochtherus deserticolus (Karsch, 1888) c g
 Neomochtherus desertorum Lehr, 1958 c g
 Neomochtherus detorsus Tsacas, 1968 c g
 Neomochtherus dichromopygus Tsacas, 1965 c g
 Neomochtherus disjunctus Tsacas, 1968 c g
 Neomochtherus distans Tsacas, 1968 c g
 Neomochtherus eulabes (Loew, 1871) c g
 Neomochtherus europaeus Tsacas, 1968 c g
 Neomochtherus exilis Tsacas, 1969 c g
 Neomochtherus farinosus (Loew, 1871) c g
 Neomochtherus firmus Tsacas, 1968 c g
 Neomochtherus flavicornis (Ruthe, 1831) c g
 Neomochtherus flavipes (Meigen, 1820) c g
 Neomochtherus fulvipes (Meigen, 1820) c g
 Neomochtherus fuscifemoratus (Macquart, 1838) c g
 Neomochtherus fuscipennis Tsacas, 1968 c g
 Neomochtherus futilis Tsacas, 1969 c g
 Neomochtherus genialis Tsacas, 1969 c g
 Neomochtherus geniculatus (Meigen, 1820) g
 Neomochtherus genitalis Parui, Kaur & Kapoor, 1999 c g
 Neomochtherus gnavus (Wulp, 1872) c g
 Neomochtherus gomerae Weinberg & Baez, 1989 c g
 Neomochtherus grandicollis (Becker, 1913) c g
 Neomochtherus granitis Tsacas, 1963 c g
 Neomochtherus grisescens Tsacas, 1968 c g
 Neomochtherus hauseri Engel, 1927 c g
 Neomochtherus helictus Tsacas, 1968 c g
 Neomochtherus hermonensis Theodor, 1980 c g
 Neomochtherus himalayensis Joseph & Parui, 1987 c g
 Neomochtherus hungaricus Engel, 1927 c g
 Neomochtherus hybopygus Tsacas, 1968 c g
 Neomochtherus hypopygialis (Schaeffer, 1916) i c g
 Neomochtherus idahoae (Martin, 1975) i c g
 Neomochtherus illustris (Schiner, 1867) c
 Neomochtherus indianus (Ricardo, 1919) c
 Neomochtherus instabilis Tsacas, 1969 c g
 Neomochtherus jucundus Lehr, 1964 c g
 Neomochtherus kaszabi Lehr, 1975 c g
 Neomochtherus kivuensis Tsacas, 1969 c g
 Neomochtherus kozlovi Lehr, 1972 c g
 Neomochtherus lanzarotae Weinberg & Baez, 1989 c g
 Neomochtherus lassenae Martin, 1975 i c g
 Neomochtherus latipennis (Hine, 1909) i c g b
 Neomochtherus leclercqi Janssens, 1968 c g
 Neomochtherus leclerqi Janssens, 1968 g
 Neomochtherus lepidus (Hine, 1909) i c g
 Neomochtherus leucophorus Tsacas, 1963 c g
 Neomochtherus libanonensis Tsacas, 1968 c g
 Neomochtherus macropygus Tsacas, 1968 c g
 Neomochtherus maikovskii Lehr, 1958 c g
 Neomochtherus maroccanus Tsacas, 1968 c g
 Neomochtherus mendax Tsacas, 1969 c g
 Neomochtherus mesopotamicus Janssens, 1961 c g
 Neomochtherus micrasiaticus Tsacas, 1968 c g
 Neomochtherus monobius (Speiser, 1910) c g
 Neomochtherus montanus (Hine, 1909) i c g
 Neomochtherus mundus (Loew, 1849) c g
 Neomochtherus nairicus Richter, 1962 c g
 Neomochtherus natalensis (Ricardo, 1919) c g
 Neomochtherus notatus Tsacas, 1969 c g
 Neomochtherus nudus (Bezzi, 1906) c
 Neomochtherus oblitus Tsacas, 1968 c g
 Neomochtherus ochrapes Hull, 1967 c g
 Neomochtherus ochriventris (Loew, 1854) c g
 Neomochtherus olivierii (Macquart, 1838) c g
 Neomochtherus orientalis Tsacas, 1968 c g
 Neomochtherus pallipes (MEIGEN, 1820) c g b  (devon red-legged robber fly)
 Neomochtherus pamphylius Tsacas, 1968 c g
 Neomochtherus patruelis (Wulp, 1872) c g
 Neomochtherus peloponnesius Tsacas, 1968 c g
 Neomochtherus perplexus (Becker, 1923) c g
 Neomochtherus petrishtshevae Stackelberg, 1937 c g
 Neomochtherus piceus (Hine, 1909) i c g
 Neomochtherus platypygus Tsacas, 1968 c g
 Neomochtherus promiscus Tsacas, 1968 c g
 Neomochtherus psathyrus Tsacas, 1968 c g
 Neomochtherus pubescens Lehr, 1996 c g
 Neomochtherus pygaeus Tsacas, 1963 c g
 Neomochtherus quettanus Tsacas, 1968 c g
 Neomochtherus rhogmopygus Tsacas, 1965 c g
 Neomochtherus rossicus Engel, 1927 c g
 Neomochtherus rothkirchii (Speiser, 1913) c g
 Neomochtherus rubipygus Lehr, 1972 c g
 Neomochtherus rutilans (Wulp, 1898) c g
 Neomochtherus sahariensis Tsacas, 1968 c g
 Neomochtherus sanguensis Oldroyd, 1964 c g
 Neomochtherus sardus Tsacas, 1965 c g
 Neomochtherus schineri (Egger, 1855) c g
 Neomochtherus schistaceus (Becker, 1908) c g
 Neomochtherus sercove Lehr, 1964 c g
 Neomochtherus siculus (Macquart, 1834) c g
 Neomochtherus signatipes Lindner, 1955 c g
 Neomochtherus sinensis Ricardo, 1919 c g
 Neomochtherus sinuatus (Loew, 1858) c g
 Neomochtherus soleus Tsacas, 1968 c g
 Neomochtherus sphaeristes Tsacas, 1963 c g
 Neomochtherus stackelbergi Lehr, 1958 c g
 Neomochtherus striatipes (Loew, 1849) c g
 Neomochtherus striatus (Wulp, 1891) c g
 Neomochtherus tenius Tsacas, 1968 c g
 Neomochtherus thrax Tsacas, 1968 c g
 Neomochtherus tricuspidatus Engel, 1927 c g
 Neomochtherus trisignatus (Ricardo, 1922) c g
 Neomochtherus unctus Oldroyd, 1939 c g
 Neomochtherus uratorum Richter, 1960 c g
 Neomochtherus willistoni (Hine, 1909) i c g b
 Neomochtherus yasya Lehr, 1996 c g

Data sources: i = ITIS, c = Catalogue of Life, g = GBIF, b = Bugguide.net

References

Neomochtherus